Adolf Friedrich, Graf von Schack (2 August 181514 April 1894) was a German poet, historian of literature and art collector.

Background
Schack was born at Brüsewitz near Schwerin. Having studied jurisprudence (1834–1838) at the universities of Bonn, Heidelberg and Berlin, he entered the Mecklenburg state service and was subsequently attached to the Kammergericht in Berlin. Tiring of official work, he resigned his appointment, and after travelling in Italy, Egypt, and Spain, was attached to the court of the grand duke of Oldenburg, whom he accompanied on a journey to the East. On his return he entered the Oldenburg government service, and in 1849 was sent as envoy to Berlin. In 1852 he retired from his diplomatic post, resided for a while on his estates in Mecklenburg and then travelled in Spain, where he studied Moorish history.

In 1855, he settled at Munich, where he was made member of the academy of sciences, and here collected a splendid gallery of pictures, containing masterpieces of Bonaventura Genelli, Anselm Feuerbach, Moritz von Schwind, Arnold Böcklin, Franz von Lenbach, etc., and which, though bequeathed by him to the Emperor William II, still remains at Munich and is one of the noted galleries in that city. He died at Rome in April 1894, aged 78.

His museum opened in 1848 and remains open as a public art museum, the Schackgalerie.

Works

Novels and poems

Lyric poems

Gedichte (1867, 6th ed., 1888).
Heimkehr (1885)

Novels in verse

Durch alle Wetter (1870, 3rd ed., 1875) and Ebenbürtig (1876).

Dramatic poems

Helidor (1878).

Tragedies

Die Pisaner (1872) and Walpurga and Der Johanniter (1887).

Political comedies

Der Kaiserbote and Cancan (1873).

Other aspects

Art and literature history

Geschichte der dramatischen Literatur and Kunst in Spanien (3 vols. 1845–1846, 2nd ed. 1854), Poesie and Kunst der Araber in Spanien and Sicilien (1865, 2nd ed. 1877), which are valuable contributions to literary history.

Translations

Spanisches Theater (1845), Heldensagen des Firdusi (1851) and Stimmen vom Ganges (1857, 2nd ed. 1877).

Catalogue and history of personal picture gallery

Meine Gemaldesammlung (7th ed., 1894).

Collected works

Gesammelte Werke, were published in six volumes (1883, 3rd ed. in to vols. 1897-1899). Nachgelassene Dichtungen were edited by G. Winkler (1896).

Other information

See his autobiography, Ein halbes Jahrhundert, Erinnerungen and Aufzeichnungen (3 vols. 1887, 3rd ed. 1894). Cf. further the accounts of Schack by F. W. Rogge (1883), E. Zabel (1885), E. Brenning (1885), W. J. Mannsen (from the Dutch, 1889), and also L. Berg, Zwischen zwei Jahrhunderten (1896).

References

External links
 
 

German Hispanists
Spanish–German translators
1815 births
German Arabists
German art collectors
Museum founders
19th-century art collectors
1894 deaths
19th-century translators
19th-century German writers
19th-century German male writers
German male non-fiction writers